Alfred Maris Mauck (March 6, 1869 – April 27, 1921), was a Major League Baseball player who played pitcher in . He would play for the Chicago Colts.

External links

1869 births
1921 deaths
Major League Baseball pitchers
Chicago Colts players
19th-century baseball players
Danville Browns players
Burlington Hawkeyes players
Birmingham Grays players
Rock Island-Moline Islanders players
Indianapolis Hoosiers (minor league) players
Kansas City Cowboys (minor league) players
Des Moines Prohibitionists players
Des Moines Indians players
St. Joseph Saints players
Topeka Giants players
Omaha Omahogs players
Des Moines Hawkeyes players
Baseball players from Indiana
People from Princeton, Indiana
Peru (minor league baseball) players